Nineteen of William Shakespeare's plays first appeared in quarto before the publication of the First Folio in 1623, eighteen of those before his death in 1616. One play co-authored with John Fletcher, The Two Noble Kinsmen, was first published in 1634, and one play first published in the First Folio, The Taming of the Shrew, was later published in quarto. Following are listed the Shakespeare plays that appeared in quarto up to 1642 with complete title page information from each edition.

Plays first published before 1623

Henry VI, Part 2 

Q1 1594

The play known as King Henry VI, Part 2 was entered into the Stationers Register 12 March 1594 and printed that same year by Thomas Creede for Thomas Millington. As it appears in the First Folio, the play is about a third longer than the first quarto version. Most scholars agree that the 1594 version as printed is a memorial reconstruction, or bad quarto, but they are divided as to whether it is based on the full folio version or an abridged and possibly revised version of the play. STC 26099; 64 pages.

Q2 1600

Q3 1619 (not dated, printed with Henry VI, Part 3 as part of Thomas Pavier's False Folio)

Titus Andronicus 

Q1 1594

Q2 1600

Q3 1611

Richard III 

Q1 1597

Q2 1598

Q3 1602

Q4 1605

Q5 1612

Q6 1622

Q7 1629

Q8 1634

Henry VI, Part 3 

Octavo 1 1595

Q2 1600

Q3 1619 (not dated, printed with Henry VI, Part 2 as part of Thomas Pavier's False Folio)

Romeo and Juliet 

Q1 1597

Q2 1599

Q3 1609

Q4 a 1622 (not dated)

Q4 b 1622 (not dated)

Q5 1637

Richard II 

Q1 1597

Q2 1598

Q3 1598

Q4 a 1608

Q4 b 1608

Q5 1615

Q6 1634

Henry IV, Part 1 

Quarto 0 1598

This version thought to be earlier than Q1 is known only from a single fragment in the Folger Shakespeare Library, comprising four leaves of quire C that was found in a book binding. The running headline uses the word "hystorie" instead of "historie" and line spoken by Poins in 2.2, "How the rogue roared" is given as "How the fat rogue roared".

Q1 1598

Q2 1599

Q3 1604

Q4 1608

Q5 1613

Q6 1622

Q7 1632

Q8 1639

Love's Labour's Lost 

Q 1598

Henry IV, Part 2 

Quarto a (84 pages) omits the first scene of act iii and eight other passages in quire E. Quarto b (88 pages) adds the missing first scene of act iii and resets the immediately surrounding text, adding two leaves to quire E. The title pages are identical.

Q 1600

Henry V 

Q1, 1600

Q2, 1602

Q3, 1619 (falsely dated 1608 as part of Thomas Pavier's False Folio)

A Midsummer Night's Dream 

Q1 1600

Q2 1619 (falsely dated 1600 as part of Thomas Pavier's False Folio)

Merchant of Venice 

Q1 1600

Q2 1619 (falsely dated 1600 as part of Thomas Pavier's False Folio)

Q3 1637

Much Ado About Nothing 

Q 1600

Merry Wives of Windsor 

Q1 1602

Q2 1619 (publisher falsely stated as Arthur Johnson as part of Thomas Pavier's False Folio)

Q3 1630

Hamlet 

Q1 1603

Q2 a 1604

Q2 b 1605

Q3 1611

Q4 1622 (no date)

Q5 1637

King Lear 

Q1 1608

Q2 1619 (falsely dated 1608 as part of Thomas Pavier's False Folio)

Troilus and Cressida 

Q a 1609

Q b 1609

Pericles, Prince of Tyre 

Q1 1609

Q2 1609

Q3 1611

Q4a 1619 (first state as part of Thomas Pavier's False Folio)

Q4b 1619 (corrected state falsely dated 1609 as part of Thomas Pavier's False Folio)

Q5 1630

Q6 1635

Othello 

Q1 1622

Q2 1630

Plays first published after 1623

The Taming of the Shrew 

Q 1631

Two Noble Kinsmen 

Q 1634

Footnotes

References

 .
 .
 .

Quarto
Lists of plays
Shakespeare, William
Bibliographies of British writers
Dramatist and playwright bibliographies